Mokgadi Johanna Aphiri is a South African politician who has represented the African National Congress (ANC) in the Limpopo Provincial Legislature since 2014. She was first elected to her seat in the 2014 general election, ranked 38th on the ANC's provincial party list, and was re-elected in the 2019 general election, ranked 32nd. She was elected to the Provincial Executive Committee of the ANC's Limpopo branch in June 2018 but was not re-elected in June 2022.

References

External links 

 
 "ANC suspends officials"
 "Malema’s 'list' of pals feed on school meals"

Living people
Year of birth missing (living people)
African National Congress politicians
Members of the Limpopo Provincial Legislature
21st-century South African politicians
21st-century South African women politicians
Women members of provincial legislatures of South Africa